Calliandra paniculata is a species of plant in the family Fabaceae. It is found only in Jamaica. It is threatened by habitat loss.

References

paniculata
Vulnerable plants
Endemic flora of Jamaica
Taxonomy articles created by Polbot